The Fellowship of the British Academy consists of world-leading scholars and researchers in the humanities and social sciences. A number of fellows are elected each year in July at the Academy's annual general meeting.

1999 
The following fellows of the British Academy were elected at the annual general meeting in 1999:

 Professor W. G. Arnott (formerly University of Leeds), Classics 
 Professor G. W. W. Barker (University of Leicester), Archaeology 
 Professor A. J. Bate (University of Liverpool), English Literature 
 Professor J. S. Bell (University of Leeds), Law 
 Professor R. A. Brealey (Bank of England), Economics 
 Professor R. Breen (Queen's University Belfast on leave at European University Institute), Sociology 
 Professor V. G. Bruce (University of Stirling), Psychology 
 Professor D. N. Cannadine (Institute of Historical Research, University of London), History 
 Dr M. T. Clanchy (University of London), History 
 Professor I. Clark (University of Wales, Aberystwyth), International History 
 Professor L. J. Colley (London School of Economics and Political Science), History 
 Professor K. J. Gray (University of Cambridge), Law
 Professor C. K. Green (Courtauld Institute of Art, University of London), History of Art 
 Professor C. R. Harlow (London School of Economics and Political Science), Law
 Professor A. C. Harvey (University of Cambridge), Econometrics
 Dr G. Herrmann (University College London), Archaeology 
 Professor J. Higgins (University of Liverpool), Latin American Literature
 Professor M. E. Hobson (Queen Mary and Westfield College, University of London), French Studies
 Dr A. B. Hunt (University of Oxford), French Literature
 Professor W. R. James (University of Oxford), Social Anthropology 
 Professor R. J. Johnston (University of Bristol), Geography
 Professor P. D. Klemperer (University of Oxford), Economics 
 Dr V. A. Law (University of Cambridge), History of Linguistics 
 Dr M. C. McKendrick (University of Cambridge), Hispanic Studies 
 Dr R. I. McKibbin (University of Oxford), History 
 Professor W. F. Madelung (University of Oxford), Arabic
 Professor I. Markova (University of Stirling), Psychology
 Professor J. H. Hardman Moore (London School of Economics and Political Science; University of St Andrews), Economics 
 Professor T. O'Riordan (University of East Anglia), Environmental Sciences 
 Professor J. B. Paris (University of Manchester), Mathematical Logic
 Professor J. T. Reason (University of Manchester), Psychology
 Professor N. V. Smith (University College London), Linguistics 
 Professor H. I. Steiner (University of Manchester), Political Studies
 Professor M. W. Swales (University College London), German Literature

1998 
The following fellows of the British Academy were elected at the annual general meeting in 1998:

 Professor S. Bann. (University of Kent), Modern Cultural Studies
 Professor E. V. Barker. (London School of Economics), Sociology
 Mr N. J. Barker. (formerly British Library), Bibliography
 Professor R. J. Bauckham. (University of St Andrews), Theology
 Dr P. A. Brand. (University of Oxford), Law
 Professor W. H. Buiter. (University of Cambridge), Economics
 Dr C. S. F. Burnett. (Warburg Institute, University of London), History
 Professor B. Buzan. (University of Westminster), Political Studies
 Professor P. P. Craig. (University of Oxford), Law
 Professor W. Doyle. (University of Bristol), History
 Professor R. I. M. Dunbar. (University of Liverpool), Psychology
 Professor P. E. Easterling. (University of Cambridge), Classics 
 Professor P. K. Edwards. (University of Warwick), Sociology
 Professor G. Hammond. (University of Manchester), Literature
 Dr P. Harris. (University of Oxford), Psychology
 Dr C. Humphrey. (University of Cambridge), Social Anthropology
 Dr G. A. Khan. (University of Cambridge), Semitic studies
 Professor A. S. Knight. (University of Oxford), History
 Dr E. McGrath. (Warburg Institute, University of London), Art History
 Professor D. I. Marquand. (University of Oxford), Political Studies
 Professor J. A. Moss. (University of Durham), French Studies
 Professor R. C. T. Parker. (University of Oxford), Ancient History
 Professor M. H. Pesaran. (University of Cambridge), Economics
 Professor P. H. Rees. (University of Leeds), Geography
 Professor R. M. Sainsbury. (King's College, London), Philosophy
 Professor R. J. Service. (School of Slavonic and East European Studies, London), History
 Professor G. Steiner. (University of Cambridge), Literature
 Professor J. S. Vickers. (University of Oxford), Economics
 Professor A. P. Weale. (University of Essex), Political Studies
 Professor A. Whittle. (University of Wales, Cardiff), Archaeology
 Professor C. J. Wickham. (University of Birmingham), History

Senior fellows 

 Dr M. Gelling. (University of Birmingham), Philology and Place-name Studies
 Mrs I. M. B. Opie. Social History

1997 
The following fellows of the British Academy were elected at the annual general meeting in 1997:

 Professor R. J. Bartlett
 Professor R. W. Blundell
 Professor V. B. Bogdanor
 Professor A. E. Bottoms
 Professor H. D. Clout
 Professor S. Cohen
 Professor G. G. Corbett
 Professor M. J. Daunton
 Professor I. N. R. Davies
 Professor K. H. F. Dyson
 Dr D. N. Fallows
 Professor D. P. Farrington
 Professor P. Fonagy
 Dr B. J. Heal
 Professor B. G. Hewitt
R. G. H. Holmes
 Rev. Dr W. Horbury
 Professor T. Ingold
 Professor J. A. Kay
 Professor B. S. Markesinis
 Dr J. N. J. Muellbauer
 Professor A. D. Nuttall
 Professor N. F. Palmer
 Dr M. Schofield
 Professor I. G. Simmons
 Professor A. Stepan
 Professor W. L. Twinning
 Professor P. M. Warren
 Professor T. Williamson
 Professor A. B. Worden

Senior Fellow 
 Professor B. Tizard

1996 
The following fellows of the British Academy were elected at the annual general meeting in 1996:

 Professor J. D. Ades
 Dr J. Bergin
 Dr J. N. Butterfield
 Professor J. Carey
 Professor N. L. D. Cartwright
 Dr A. D. Cliff
 Professor J. F. Dunn 
 Professor R. H. Finnegan
 Dr R. Foot
 Professor H. Goldstein
 Dr M. D. Goodman
 Dr I. R. Hodder
 Professor C. C. Hood
 Professor A. G. Hopkins
 Dr J. R. L. Maddicott
 Professor W. D. Marslen-Wilson
The Lord Mustill
 Professor J. L. Nelson
 Professor B. J. Pimlott
 Dr C. A. J. Prendergast
 Dr A. Pyman
 Professor N. G. Round
 Professor P. Sims-Williams
 Professor R. Sugden
 Professor J. Sutton
 Professor M. W. Thomas
 Dr D. J. Thompson
 Professor J. C. Wells
 Dr K. E. Wrightson
 Dr J. Wymer

Senior fellows 
 Professor D. K. Fieldhouse
 Professor D. N. MacKenzie

1995 
The following fellows of the British Academy were elected at the annual general meeting in 1995:

 Professor K. G. Binmore
 Dr D. A. Brading
 Professor R. J. Bradley
 Professor M. J. Budd
 Dr P. A. David
 Professor C. C. Dyer
 Professor J. F. Ermisch
 Professor L. D. Freedman
 Dr J. S. Gage
 Dr D. I. D. Gallie
 Dr A. A. F. Gell
 Professor J. T. Higginbotham
 Dame Rosalyn Higgins
 Dr J. T. Killen
 Professr D. N. Livingstone
 Dr D. J. McKitterick
 Professor S. E. Marks
 Dr J. S. Morrill
A. Murray
 Professor B. A. Rudden
 Dr E. S. Shaffer
 Dr K. Sparck Jones
 Professor H. M. Spufford
 Dr O. P. Taplin
C. C. Taylor
 Professor R. W. Thomson
 Professor L. Tyler
 Professor J. R. Woodhouse
 Dr V. Wright
 Dr T. Zeldin

Senior fellows 
 Professor M. A. E. Drummett
 Professor A. H. Halsey
 Professor R. B. Wernham

1994 
The following fellows of the British Academy were elected at the annual general meeting in 1994:

 Dr M. E. Aston
 Dr C. P. Bammel
 Professor J. B. Beer
 Dr A. K. Bowman
 P. Burke
 I. Christie
 L. A. Collins
 Professor T. M. Devine
 Professor M. Frede
 Professor M. G. Fulford
 Dr J. H. Golding
 Professor A. G. Hill
 Professor R. M. Hogg
 Professor M. Lapidge
 Professor B. J. Loasby
 Dr I. W. F. Maclean
 Professor D. L. McMullen
 Professor W. L. Miller
 Professor R. Porter
 Professor P. Preston
 Professor C. Scott
 Dr D. N. Sedley
 Professor Lord Skidelsky
 Dr P. Spufford
 Dr R. Tuck
 Professor K. F. Wallis
 Professor A. G. Wilson
 Dr B. R. Wilson

Senior fellows 
 Professor J. T. Boulton
 Dr D. E. Butler
 Dr M. B. Hall
 Professor W. R. Mead
 Professor S. Reckert

1993 
The following fellows of the British Academy were elected at the annual general meeting in 1993:

 Professor A. J. Ashworth
 Dr P. Beal
 Dr M. Bent
 Professor J. A. Bossy
 Professor M. M. Bowie
 Dr R. Cooper
 Dr E. J. Craig
 Professor C. I. E. Donaldson
 Professor R. J. Evans
 Dr P. D. A. Garnsey
 Professor R. Gray
 Professor A. G. Guest
 Dr J. F. Harris
J. D. Hawkins
 Professor G. A. Hosking
 Professor R. M. Jones
 Professor A. Karmiloff-Smith
 Professor P. Langford
 Professor D. M. MacDowell
 Professor M. M. McGowan
 Professor A. F. McPherson
 Professor S. J. Nickell
 Dr O. O'Neill
 Dr M. B. Parkes
 Professor D. J. Parkin
 J. N. Postgate
S. M. G. Reynolds
 Professor A. S. Skinner
 Professor N. Stern
 Professor R. Strohm
 Professor H. G. M. Williamson

Senior fellows 
 Professor R. M. Hatton
 Professor I. G. Kidd
 Professor A. C. Lloyd
 Professor R. A. Oliver
G. Reynolds

1992 
The following fellows of the British Academy were elected at the annual general meeting in 1992:

 Dr J. N. Adams
 Professor C. E. Bosworth
 Professor N. F. R. Crafts
 Professor W. E. Davies
 Sir Geoffrey de Ballaigue
 Dr A. I. Doyle
 Dr R. P. Duncan-Jones
 Professor P. Haggett
 Dr A. F. Heath
 Dr R. G. Hood
 Professor R. A. Hudson
 Professor J. I. Israel
 B. J. Kemp
 Professor M. A. King
 Professor M. Kinkead-Weekes
 Professor C. N. J. Mann
 Professor P. J. Marshall
 Dr H. M. R. E. Mayr-Harting
 Professor M. I. Podro
 Dr A. W. Raitt
 Professor R. Rose
 W. L. St Clair
 Dr G. C. Stone
 Professor S. R. Sutherland
 Professor R. G. Swinburne
E. P. Thompson
 Professor C. J. G. Wright

Senior fellows 
 Professor J. H. Burns
 Professor D. H. Green
A. R. A. Hobson
 Professor T. W. Hutchinson
 Professor H. M. Pelling
 Professor D. S. Thomson

1991 
The following fellows of the British Academy were elected at the annual general meeting in 1991:

 Professor J. M. Anderson
 Professor B. A. Barton
 Professor G. Beer
 Professor J. Bennett, Philosophy
 Professor R. J. Bennett
 Professor A. H. Brown
 Professor T. C. Cave
 Rev. H. E. J. Cowdrey
J. S. Flemming
 Professor J. P. A. Gould
 Professor R. G. Gruffydd
 Professor M. J. Kemp
 Professor I. Kershaw
 Professor J. H. W. G. Liebeschuetz
 Dr R. H. Lonsdale
 Professor A. Mackay
 Dr H. C. G. Matthew
 Professor D. M. G. Newbery
 Professor P. K. O'Brien
 Sir Malcolm Pasley
 Professor J. D. Y. Peel
 Professor M. L. G. Redhead
 Dr A. F. Rodger
 Professor Lord Russell
 Dr R. M. Smith
 Dr I. M. Stead

Senior fellows 
 Professor D. Abercrombie
 Rev. Professor C. F. Evans
 Professor A. T. Hatto
 K. R. Maxwell-Hyslop
 Dr G. F. Nuttall
 Professor C. Thurstan Shaw
 Dr D. P. Waley
 Professor T. S. Willan

1990 
The following fellows of the British Academy were elected at the annual general meeting in 1990:

 Professor J. M. Bately
 Professor J. O. Bayley
 Dr C. A. Bayly
 Dr T. C. W. Blanning
 Professor M. E. F. Bloch
 Professor C. P. Brand
 Professor K. N. Chaudhuri
 Professor J. M. Finnis
 Professor C. A. E. Goodhart
 Professor J. E. S. Hayward
 Dr L. Hellinga
 Professor J. M. Hollis
 Dr R. J. P. Kain
 Dr M. H. Keen
 Professor J. D. M. H. Laver
 Professor G. L. Mann
 Dr J. F. Matthews
 Dr P. A. Mellars
 Dr P. M. North
 Professor C. Peacocke
J. M. Rawson
 Professor A. Roberts
M. F. Scott
 Professor C. Shackle
 Professor J. C. Shepherdson
 Dr P. A. Slack
Jon Stallworthy
 Professor J. P. Stern
 Professor M. O. Talbot
 Professor D. C. Watt
 Dr S. R. West
 Rev. Professor R. D. Williams
 Dr D. S. M. Wilson

Senior fellows 
 Professor M. C. Bradbrook
 Professor W. R. Brock
 Dr A. C. Crombie
 Professor I. de Madariaga
 Professor J. C. Mitchell
 Professor J. K. B. M. Nicholas
 Dr G. D. Ramsay
 Professor P. J. de la F. Wiles

References